Olivier Barbarant (born 5 March 1966 Bar-sur-Aube, France) is a French poet.

Life
He lived in Paris. Since 1994, he has been living in Saint-Quentin, Picardy, where he teaches school, currently at the Lycée Lakanal in Sceaux.

In 1995, he met Veronique Elzière called Berenice in his books. He adopted Cosette in July 1995.

Awards
 2004 Mallarmé prize

Works

Poetry

Criticism, Essays, Editor

References

External links
 "New Horizons of Contemporary Lyricism in France", Jean-Michel Maulpoix, La poésie comme l'amour, Mercure de France, 1998.

1966 births
Living people
20th-century French poets
French male poets
20th-century French male writers
Prix Guillaume Apollinaire winners